Long axis may refer to:
Long axis of organs in anatomy
Longitudinal axis of flight control surfaces